The Fort River is a river in Western Massachusetts and is a tributary of the Connecticut River and runs through the towns of, Amherst, Massachusetts, and ends in Hadley, Massachusetts.

The Fort technically begins as Adams Brook which begins at a pond near Atkin's Reservoir in Shutesbury, Massachusetts (however the ponds aren't part of the reservoir), and flows south-west ward until it reaches the spot where Amythest Brook flows into it, where it becomes the "Fort River." Although it has no dams or man-made things on the river, some of the Fort's tributaries have reservoirs.

The Fort River has a wide variety of wildlife due to it being the longest free-flowing tributary (having no dams or other man made changes made to the rivers shape or flow) of the Connecticut River. Because of this there is a lot of wildlife making it one of the 3 most diverse rivers in the state. Mussels, Eastern Pearlfish, Sea Lampreys, and American Eel's.

References

External links
River resource article

Rivers of Massachusetts
Tributaries of the Connecticut River
Geography of New England
Rivers of Franklin County, Massachusetts
Rivers of Hampshire County, Massachusetts
Geography of Amherst, Massachusetts